Giovanni Maria Della Torre (Rome, 16 June 1710 – Naples, 7 March 1782) was an Italian priest, naturalist and scientist who wrote several influential books on natural science and taught at several places around Italy. 

Della Torre was born in Rome and sources differ on his birth year. His father Marquis Michele came from Lavagna but had moved to Genoa. Della Torre studied in Rome and went to the Clementine College where he studied mathematics under Domenico Chelucci (1681–1754). He joined the Somaschi Fathers taking his final vows in 1730 and he then taught mathematics at the Clementine College in Rome from 1736. He then taught at seminaries in Naples, teaching mathematics and experimental physics. His major contribution was the series of books on the Scienza della natura (Science of Nature) published initially in two volume (1748-49). He documented the Vesuvius eruption of 1751. In 1763 he wrote about his observations made under a microscope that he constructed.

References

External links 
 
 
 
 
 
 
 
 

1710 births
1782 deaths
18th-century Italian astronomers
Italian scientists
Scientists from Naples